Mar de plástico is a Spanish crime drama television series produced by Boomerang TV for Atresmedia. It airs on Atresmedia's main channel Antena 3. The series focuses on the investigation of a murder in the fictional town of Campoamargo, set in an area of the province of Almería known as the "plastic sea" due to the numerous greenhouses that cover it, and the interracial conflicts that arise in the greenhouses. The pilot episode aired on 22 September 2015, being simulcast on Antena 3, Neox, Nova and Mega.

In November 2015, Antena 3 announced that the series had been renewed for a second season, which was later confirmed as the last one.

Plot

Season 1
On a hot night in Campoamargo, Almería, Ainhoa Sánchez (Mara López), daughter of the town's mayor, heads to a date in the greenhouse area, known as the "Plastic Sea". Suddenly there is a power outage and Ainhoa is brutally attacked and killed in the dark. The next morning, the crops are watered by her blood and nobody knows anything about the disappeared girl. The same day, Héctor Aguirre (Rodolfo Sancho), sergeant of the Civil Guard and chief of the Judicial Police, happens to arrive in Campoamargo and begins the crime investigation. A crime many people had reasons to commit, and few of them have alibis. Aguirre, a veteran of Afghanistan with severe anger management issues, knows he is in for the hardest investigation of his career.

Season 2
After the murderer of Ainhoa Sánchez is caught and imprisoned, Campoamargo seems to have regained its calm - but not for long: Marta Ezquerro (Belén López), a local engineer, is found dead in a container with signs of having received a hard blow to the head. And she might not be the only victim; a new killer has emerged in the town and nobody is safe.

Main Cast

Regular 
Rodolfo Sancho as Héctor Aguirre
Belén López as Marta Ezquerro
Pedro Casablanc as Juan Rueda
Nya de la Rubia as Lola Requena
Lucho Fernández as Salva Morales 
Patrick Criado as Fernando Rueda
Jesús Castro as Lucas Morales (season 1)
 as Sergio Rueda
 as Pilar Salinas
Yaima Ramos as Fara Okembe (season 1)
 as Khaled Okembe
 as Carmen Almunia (season 1)
 as Agneska Spassky
Máximo Pastor as Nacho Torres
Jesús Carroza as Manuel "Lolo" Requena
Andrea Ros as Mar Sánchez (season 1)
José Chaves as Amancio Morales (season 1)
Luka Peros as Eric (season 1)
 as Pablo Torres
Adelaida Polo as Sol Requena (season 2)
 as Vlad Dragić (season 2)

Recurring 
Mara López as Ainhoa Sánchez 
Julio Vélez as Antonio Requena 
Elías Pelayo as Francisco Salinas 
 as Teodoro 
Gala Évora as Remedios "Reme"
Marina Esteve as Paula
Ángela Vega as Manuela 
Oti Manzano as Asunción 
Alain Hernández as Jorge Díaz 
 as Álvaro Conesa
Verónica Moral as Marisa 
Fernando Cayo as Luis San José

Episodes and ratings

Season 1

Season 2

References

2010s Spanish drama television series
2015 Spanish television series debuts
2016 Spanish television series endings
Antena 3 (Spanish TV channel) network series
Spanish crime television series
Television shows set in Andalusia
2010s crime drama television series
Television series by Boomerang TV